Lacinutrix venerupis is a Gram-negative, strictly aerobic and non-motile bacterium from the genus of Lacinutrix which has been isolated from clams from Galicia  in Spain.

References 

Flavobacteria
Bacteria described in 2016